Magic Silver II is a 2011 Norwegian children's adventure film. The Blaafarveværket industrial museum was used as a setting. The film is a sequel to the 2009 film Magic Silver and was the first 3D film produced in Norway. It was viewed in the theaters by 272,719 people, and was the first Scandinavian 3-D live action film.

Cast
Ane Viola Semb as Fjellrose
Johan Tinus Lindgren as Dreng
Toralv Maurstad as Mosetussen
Per Christian Ellefsen as Rimspå
Elsa Lystad as Gamlemor
Robert Skjærstad as Nissefyken
Geir Morstad as Kullbaronen
Stig Werner Moe as Mons
Simon Andersen as Pilten

References

External links 
 

2011 films
Films based on television series
2010s Norwegian-language films
Norwegian children's films